Rolf Lofstad (born 31 October 1953) is a Norwegian sports shooter. He competed in the men's 50 metre free pistol event at the 1984 Summer Olympics.

References

1953 births
Living people
Norwegian male sport shooters
Olympic shooters of Norway
Shooters at the 1984 Summer Olympics
Sportspeople from Oslo